Iveta Benešová (formerly Melzer, ; born 1 February 1983) is a Czech former tennis player. She began playing tennis at age of seven and turned professional in 1998. She won two WTA Tour singles and 14 doubles tournaments, and one Grand Slam title in mixed doubles, partnering with Jürgen Melzer at the 2011 Wimbledon Championships. On 14 September 2012, she married Melzer and adopted his family name (until 2015). She announced her retirement from professional tennis on 13 August 2014.

Career

2005–2008
Benešová was the first player to be beaten by Ana Ivanovic in the main draw of a Grand Slam tournament, at the 2005 Australian Open.

At the 2006 Australian Open, for the first time, she reached the third round of a Grand Slam championship by beating fifth seed Mary Pierce. She lost in the next round to former world No. 1, Martina Hingis.

Entering as a qualifier in the 2008 French Open, she reached the third round, beating 15th seed and compatriate Nicole Vaidišová in the first round, but lost to Petra Cetkovská.

2009

Benešová started the year by playing the first edition of the Brisbane International. She lost in the first round to qualifier Sesil Karatantcheva. A week later, Benešová lost in the final of the tournament in Hobart to fellow-Czech Petra Kvitová. At the Australian Open, she lost in the second round to eventual semifinalist and fourth-seeded Elena Dementieva.

Immediately after Australian, Benešová played in front of her home crowd in the Fed Cup tie against Spain. Despite losing her singles rubber to Nuria Llagostera Vives, the Czech team advanced to the semifinals after winning the tie 4–1.

At the Open GdF Suez in Paris, she lost in the first round to world No. 1, Serena Williams. Benešová then reached the semifinals of the tournament in Acapulco, a clay-court event. In the quarterfinals, she beat Mathilde Johansson before losing in the semifinals to defending champion Flavia Pennetta.

On 6 April 2009, Benešová achieved her career-high singles ranking of world No. 25.

Seeded sixth at the first edition of the Monterrey Open, she beat fellow Czech Barbora Záhlavová-Strýcová in the quarterfinals before losing in the semifinals to unseeded Li Na.

Benešová fell to Ana Ivanovic in the third round of the French Open.

At Wimbledon, she beat Britain's Katie O'Brien, before falling to Jelena Janković in the second round.

2010
In singles, she defeated Romanian Simona Halep in the final of Grand Prix SAR La Princesse Lalla Meryem to win her first WTA Tour trophy since 2004.

In doubles, she has won three titles. Along with Barbora Záhlavová-Strýcová, she grabbed the titles in Paris as their opponents Cara Black and Liezel Huber withdrew and Monterrey defeating Anna-Lena Grönefeld and Vania King. Partnering with Anabel Medina Garrigues, Benešová won Fes, making her winning both singles and doubles in the tournament.

2011
Benešová reached the fourth round of the Australian Open, but was defeated by second seed Vera Zvonareva.

Along with Záhlavová-Strýcová she won four titles in doubles.

At the Wimbledon Championships, she won the mixed doubles title with partner and later husband Jürgen Melzer.

2012
Benešová once again reached the fourth round of the Australian Open, being defeated by eventual champion Victoria Azarenka, in straight sets.
On 29 April 2012 she won her last title at the Stuttgart doubles, again with Záhlavová-Strýcová.

She paused from playing tournaments until February 2014, mainly due to shoulder problems.

2014
In her first tournament as Iveta Melzer, she and her partner Petra Cetkovská reached the final of the Acapulco doubles which they lost in the third set.

At the French Open she played the mixed doubles with her husband Jürgen, they lost in the first round against top seeded Alexander Peya and Abigail Spears. It was their last Grand Slam mixed appearance together, at the Wimbledon mixed doubles Jürgen Melzer partnered Anabel Medina Garrigues.

Iveta Melzer ended her career on 15 August 2014, as shoulder problems prevented her from playing her best tennis.

Personal life
On 14 September 2012, Benešová married Austrian tennis player Jürgen Melzer in Austria at Laxenburg Castle. The relationship ended in 2015 and Iveta changed her name back to Benešová.

Performance timelines
Only main-draw results in WTA Tour, Grand Slam tournaments, Fed Cup and Olympic Games are included in win–loss records.

Singles

Doubles

Grand Slam finals

Mixed doubles: 1 (title)

WTA career finals

Singles: 8 (2 titles, 6 runner-ups)

Doubles: 26 (14 titles, 12 runner-ups)

ITF finals

Singles: 5 (4 titles, 1 runner–up)

Doubles: 8 (4 titles, 4 runner–ups)

Head-to-head record

Top 10 wins

Notes

References

External links

 
 
 

1983 births
Living people
Sportspeople from Most (city)
Czech female tennis players
Olympic tennis players of the Czech Republic
Tennis players at the 2004 Summer Olympics
Tennis players at the 2008 Summer Olympics
Wimbledon champions
Grand Slam (tennis) champions in mixed doubles